The Wadi Lebda Dam is an embankment dam located on Wadi Lebda,  south of Khoms in the Murqub District, Libya. Completed in 1982, the primary purpose of the dam is water supply for irrigation and flood control.

References

Lebda
Dams completed in 1982
1982 establishments in Libya